Nathan Bryan may refer to:

Nathan Bryan (North Carolina politician) (1748–1798), U.S. congressman from North Carolina
Nathan Philemon Bryan (1872–1935), lawyer, federal judge, and U.S. Senator from Florida
Nathan Bryan (scientist), American biologist